was a Japanese cartoonist, writer, manga artist and anime pioneer who founded the anime studio Tatsunoko Productions.

Biography

Born in 1932, Yoshida grew up in the hardship of war-torn Japan. A self-taught artist, his first job was as working for local newspapers in Kyoto. After finding success as a manga artist in Tokyo, including winning the Shogakukan Manga Award in 1972 for The Adventures of Hutch the Honeybee, in 1962 he founded Tatsunoko with his two younger brothers, Kenji (who took over Tatsuo's position as producer after he died) and Toyoharu (a.k.a. Ippei Kuri). The studio's name has a double Japanese meaning of "Tatsu's child" and "sea dragon" which was the inspiration for its seahorse logo.

Yoshida made the jump from print to the screen and found modest success with the anime racing series Mach GoGoGo. Once adapted to the American market, it achieved resounding success as Speed Racer. Yoshida also created the action series Gatchaman (also known as Battle of the Planets and G-Force: Guardians of Space), Casshan (also known as Neo-Human Casshern, now remade as the live-action film Casshern and the continuity reboot Casshern Sins), Hurricane Polymar and Tekkaman: The Space Knight.

Though Tatsuo Yoshida's career was cut short by his death from liver cancer in 1977, Tatsunoko Productions has continued to partner with top creators to create additional hit series such as Macross, Mospeada, Robotech, Generator Gawl, Time Bokan, and Karas.

Anime credits
Ninja Squad Moonlight (1964, also known as Phantom Agents)
Space Ace (1965)
Mach GoGoGo (1967, also known as Speed Racer)
Oraa Guzura Dado (1967)
Dokachin the Primitive Boy (1968)
Judo Boy (1969)
Hakushon Daimaō (1969, also known as Bob in the Bottle or The Genie Family)
Kagaku Ninja Tai Gatchaman (1972, dubbed and re-edited as Battle of the Planets and G-Force: Guardians of Space in North America)
Casshan (1973)
Hurricane Polymar (1974)
Tekkaman: The Space Knight (1975)
Time Bokan (1975)
Gowapper 5 Gordam (1976)
Paul's Miraculous Adventure (1976)
Yatterman (1977)
Ippatsu Kanta-kun (1977)
Temple the Balloonist (1977)

Further reading
Speed Racer: The Original Manga by Tatsuo Yoshida

References

External links
 
 
Tatsuo Yoshida biography on Lambiek

Japanese animators
Japanese anime producers
1932 births
1977 deaths
Deaths from cancer in Japan
Deaths from liver cancer
Manga artists from Kyoto Prefecture
People from Kyoto
Tatsunoko Production people